Miandeh (also Romanized as Mīāndeh, Meyān Deh, and Mīān Deh) is a village in Hasan Reza Rural District, in the Central District of Juybar County, Mazandaran Province, Iran. At the 2006 census, its population was 425, in 110 families.

References 

Populated places in Juybar County